The Colonel John Ashley House is a historic house museum at 117 Cooper Hill Road in Sheffield, Massachusetts.  Built in 1735 by a prominent local leader, it is one of the oldest houses in southern Berkshire County.  The museum is owned and operated by The Trustees of Reservations, and is listed on the National Register of Historic Places.

Description
The Ashley House stands in a rural area of central southern Sheffield, on the south side of Cooper Hill Road west of the village of Ashley Falls.  The house stands on  historically associated with it, but is not on its original site, having been moved 3/10 of a mile in 1930 to improve its siting relative to the road and associated outbuildings.  The property is adjacent to Bartholomew's Cobble, a nature preserve also owned by The Trustees of Reservations.

The house is a -story wood-frame structure, with a side-gable roof and central chimney.  A -story cross-gabled ell extends to the rear, also with a chimney.  The exterior is finished in wooden clapboards.  The main facade is five bays wide, with an elaborate central doorway surround. Pilasters rise to a wide entablature capped by a broken pediment.

The house is typical of early 18th century rural American architecture, with furnishings and items dating from the 18th and early 19th centuries. It is open for tours on weekends from Memorial Day through Columbus Day.

History
The house was built in 1735 by John Ashley (1710-?), who moved to the area from Westfield.  The house timbers were sawn using the first sawmill known to have been built in Berkshire County.  Ashley was a leading citizen of the area, heading the local militia during the French and Indian War. In 1773 the Sheffield Declaration, a petition against British tyranny and manifesto for individual rights, was drafted in the upstairs study of the house.

By the American Revolutionary War, Ashley was too old to participate militarily, but he was instrumental in developing the iron industry in nearby Salisbury, Connecticut for the war effort.

In 1781, Elizabeth "Mum Bett" Freeman, a slave in the Ashley household, won her freedom under the new state constitution through a celebrated 1781 state court battle that marked the end of slavery in the state.

Gallery

See also
National Register of Historic Places listings in Berkshire County, Massachusetts

References

The Trustees of Reservations
Historic house museums in Massachusetts
Museums in Berkshire County, Massachusetts
Houses in Berkshire County, Massachusetts
Houses on the National Register of Historic Places in Berkshire County, Massachusetts
Sheffield, Massachusetts
Houses completed in 1735